Nikolay Leonidovich Moskalenko (born 3 January 1990) is a Russian professional association football player. He plays for FC Forte Taganrog.

Club career
He made his debut for the main squad of FC Kuban Krasnodar on 24 August 2016 in a Russian Cup game against FC Energomash Belgorod.

In 2020, Moskalenko joined FC Forte Taganrog.

References

External links
 

1990 births
Sportspeople from Krasnodar
Living people
Russian people of Ukrainian descent
Russian footballers
Association football goalkeepers
FC Krasnodar players
FC Armavir players
FC Kuban Krasnodar players
FC Urozhay Krasnodar players